Memoirs at the End of the World is The Postmarks second album, and was released on August 18, 2009.

Pitchfork.com gave the album a 7.6/10.0

Track listing
"No One Said This Would Be Easy" - 3:33
"My Lucky Charm" - 4:33
"Thorn In Your Side" - 3:29
"Don't Know Till You Try" - 3:08
"All You Ever Wanted" - 5:01	
"Run Away Love" - 1:04
"For Better...or Worse?" - 3:19
"I'm In Deep" - 3:48
"Thorn In Your Side (Reprise)" - 1:33
"Go Jetsetter" - 3:01
"Theme from 'Memoirs'" - 2:14
"The Girl from Algenib" - 6:17
"Gone" - 4:30

Personnel
 Tim Yehezkely - Vocals
 Christopher Moll - Guitar, Vocals, Instrumentation
 Jon Wilkins - Drums, Instrumentation
 Jeff Wagner - Keyboards, Instrumentation
 Brian Hill - Bass

References

2009 albums